Punnagai Desam is a 2002 Indian Tamil-language drama film directed by K. Shajahan. The film was produced by R. B. Choudary under the production banner Super Good films. The film stars Tharun, Sneha, Kunal, Hamsavardhan, Dhamu and Preetha Vijayakumar with Devan, Nizhalgal Ravi, Vinu Chakravarthy and Malaysia Vasudevan playing supporting roles. Soundtrack is composed by S. A. Rajkumar.

R. Madhi and V. Jaishankar handled cinematography and editing respectively. It did reasonable business at the box-office upon release on 14 January 2002. It was remade by Shajahan in Telugu in 2007 with the title Nava Vasantham.

Plot 
Ganesh (Tharun) comes to Chennai with the hope of meeting his maternal uncle Rajarathinam (Devan) following his mother Parvathi's (Sabitha Anand) sudden death. Parvathi helped Rajarathinam during his struggling days. But the latter has transformed into a rich and arrogant guy and he ditches Ganesh. Ganesh also loves his uncle's daughter Bomma who was his childhood friend. But Rajarathinam does not allow Ganesh to meet his daughter and thrashes him out of his home.

Ganesh meets his school friends Selvam (Hamsavardhan), Raja (Kunal) and Vijay (Dhamu). Selvam aspires to become an IAS officer; Raja wants to become a singer while Vijay aspires to become a mimicry artist. But their parents don't support their children's ambitions and they want them to go for some work which will help earn some money. The friends get disappointed and they leave to Chennai with hopes of achieving big. But despite trying hard, Raja and Vijay does not get any opportunity to prove their talents. Selvam studies in a college but finds difficult to pay his education fees.

Ganesh understands the poor state of his friends and decides to help them. He sells Parvathi's chain which he was planning to give to Bomma and sets up a small roadside food business near Marina Beach. Ganesh cooks well and starts selling packaged lunch in roadside. With the money, he helps his friends. But Ganesh does not inform about his struggle to his friends, instead he lies to them that Rajarathinam gives him the money as and when required.

All four stay in a small home and the house owner Ravi Chandhiran (Malaysia Vasudevan) advises them to go for some job instead of following their dreams so that they can earn some money and improve their living condition. He also feels sad for Ganesh for spending all the hard earned money for the sake of his friends. Instead, Ganesh remains positive about his friends’ talents and believes that they will succeed in life.

Nandhini (Preetha Vijayakumar) and Priya (Sneha) are Selvam's classmates. Nandhini loves Selvam but he does not reciprocate. Meanwhile, Priya is the daughter of Rajarathinam and she is none other than Bomma who is Ganesh's would be.

One day, Raja and Vijay spot Ganesh in the beach selling tea. They get shocked after coming to know the struggle Ganesh has undergone to make his friends lead a decent life. They feel proud to have such a friend and they decide to help him. All four friends jointly set up a small hotel where Ganesh cooks while the others serve and do other works in their free time.

One day Selvam scolds Nandhini asking her to stop following him. He also explains that he is not in a position to love and he wants to become an IAS office thereby fulfilling his friend's dream. Nandhini understands his position and both Nandhini and Priya go along with Selvam to meet Ganesh. Nandhini and Priya feel proud seeing Ganesh. All of them become close friends and they hang out frequently. Priya starts liking Ganesh and love blossoms in her heart.

Ganesh tries hard by requesting a sabha manager to provide an opportunity for Vijay and Raja to perform. Ganesh sells his hotel and pays the deposit following which the manager agrees and Vijay and Raja perform on the stage. Raja sings while Vijay gives the background music through mimicry. The duo become more famous and fame follows them. Subsequently, Selvam clears IAS and gets posted as a collector. All the three friends get popularity and are well settled while Ganesh still works in a hotel.

Priya comes to propose her love to Ganesh but gets shocked to know that Ganesh is already in love with Bomma and feels disappointed. Meanwhile, Rajarathinam plans her wedding with their family friend Ashok Kumar for which Priya agrees though not interested.

A function is organized in the city center of Chennai for felicitating Raja, Selvam and Vijay's talents. Now their parents come there and they ill-treat Ganesh as he is poor. During the function, Raja, Selvam and Vijay thank their parents. Ravi Chandhiran gets depressed seeing this and scolds Ganesh that this is how people behave when they have money and get fame. He says that Ganesh wasted all his earnings for the sake of his friends while his friends have forgotten him after attaining popularity and betrayed him.

But in an eventual twist, Raja, Selvam and Vijay inform on stage that they had praised their parents just for a formality and they helped them in no way during their struggling days. They also introduce Ganesh and ask him to come on stage. They thank him in front of everyone and say that it was him who was their mental support.

Finally they reveal about Ganesh's childhood love towards Bomma. They display the childhood picture of Bomma on stage and requests Bomma to come and meet Ganesh if she sees this program which is getting live telecasted. They also say that all the money earned by them belong only to Ganesh while Rajarathinam ditched him for being poor. Priya on seeing the picture understands that it was herself and she runs to the function and sees Ganesh. Everyone is surprised including Ganesh and the movie happily ends with him and Priya reuniting.

Cast 

 Tharun as Ganesh, the protagonist
 Sneha as Priya alias Bomma, Ganesh's fiancé and love interest
 Kunal as Raja
 Hamsavardhan as Selvam
 Dhamu as Vijay
 Preetha Vijayakumar as Nandhini, Selvam's love interest
 Krishna as Ashok Kumar, Priya's relative
 Vinu Chakravarthy as Vijay's Father
 Nizhalgal Ravi as Raja's Father
 Malaysia Vasudevan as Ravi Chandhiran, the House owner
 Sabitha Anand as Parvathi, Ganesh's mother and Rajarathinam's elder sister
 Devan as Rajarathinam, Priya's father and Ganesh's maternal uncle
 Vadivukkarasi as Selvam's stepmother
 Sathyapriya as Lakshmi, Priya's mother and Ganesh's mother in law
 Madhan Bob as a music director of a carnatic program
 Stun Siva as a thief (Guest appearance)

Soundtrack
Soundtrack was composed by S. A. Rajkumar.

Reception
A critic from Chennai Online opined that "It is a real good film, neatly scripted, with the scenes flowing smoothly". A critic from Sify wrote that "On the whole the film lacks soul and style associated with the Vikraman school of film-making". A critic from The Hindu said that "Probably the director is trying to make a valid point — that our channels are so starved of programmes that even family re-unions can make entertaining live telecasts!"

References

2002 films
2002 romantic drama films
2000s Tamil-language films
Films scored by S. A. Rajkumar
Tamil films remade in other languages
2002 directorial debut films
Indian romantic drama films
Indian buddy films
Super Good Films films